Claudia Pană (born 23 January 2002) is a Romanian footballer who plays as a midfielder for Liga I club ACS Heniu Prundu Bârgăului the Romania women's national team.

References

2002 births
Living people
Women's association football midfielders
Romanian women's footballers
Romania women's international footballers
FCU Olimpia Cluj players